The pound or pound-mass is a unit of mass used in British imperial and United States customary systems of measurement. Various definitions have been used; the most common today is the international avoirdupois pound, which is legally defined as exactly , and which is divided into 16 avoirdupois ounces.

The unit is descended from the Roman  (hence the abbreviation "lb").  The English word pound is cognate with, among others, German , Dutch , and Swedish . These units are historic and are no longer used (replaced by the metric system).

Usage of the unqualified term pound reflects the historical conflation of mass and weight. This accounts for the modern distinguishing terms pound-mass and pound-force.

Etymology
The word 'pound' and its cognates ultimately derive from a borrowing into Proto-Germanic of the  Latin expression  ('the weight measured in '), in which the word  is the ablative singular of the Latin noun  ('weight').

Current use
The United States and countries of the Commonwealth of Nations agreed upon common definitions for the pound and the yard. Since 1 July 1959, the international avoirdupois pound (symbol lb) has been defined as exactly .

In the United Kingdom, the use of the international pound was implemented in the Weights and Measures Act 1963.

An avoirdupois pound is equal to 16 avoirdupois ounces and to exactly 7,000 grains. The conversion factor between the kilogram and the international pound was therefore chosen to be divisible by 7 with a terminating decimal representation, and an (international) grain is thus equal to exactly .

In the UK, the process of metrication and European units of measurement directives were expected to eliminate the use of the pound and ounce, but in 2007 the European Commission abandoned the requirement for metric-only labelling on packaged goods there, and allowed for dual metric–imperial marking to continue indefinitely. When used as a measurement of body weight, common UK practice outside medical settings remains to use the stone of 14 pounds as the primary measure e.g. "11 stone 4 pounds", rather than "158 pounds" (as done in the US), or "72 kilograms" as used elsewhere.

In the United States, the Metric Conversion Act of 1975 declared the metric system to be the “preferred system of weights and measures” but did not suspend use of United States customary units, and the United States is the only industrialised country where commercial activities do not predominantly use the metric system, despite many efforts to do so, and the pound remains widely used as one of the key customary units.

Historical use

Historically, in different parts of the world, at different points in time, and for different applications, the pound (or its translation) has referred to broadly similar but not identical standards of mass or force.

Roman 

The  (Latin for 'scale'/'balance') is an ancient Roman unit of mass that is now equivalent to 328.9 grams. It was divided into 12 , or ounces. The  is the origin of the abbreviation for pound, "lb".

In Britain
A number of different definitions of the pound have historically been used in Britain. Among these were the avoirdupois pound and the obsolete Tower, merchant's and London pounds. Troy pounds and ounces remain in use only for the weight of certain precious metals, especially in the trade; these are normally quoted just in ounces (e.g. "500 ounces") and, when the type of ounce is not explicitly stated, the troy system is assumed.

Historically, the pound sterling was a Tower pound of silver. In 1528, the standard was changed to the Troy pound.

Avoirdupois pound

The avoirdupois pound, also known as the wool pound, first came into general use c. 1300. It was initially equal to 6992 troy grains. The pound avoirdupois was divided into 16 ounces. During the reign of Queen Elizabeth, the avoirdupois pound was redefined as 7,000 troy grains. Since then, the grain has often been an integral part of the avoirdupois system. By 1758, two Elizabethan Exchequer standard weights for the avoirdupois pound existed, and when measured in troy grains they were found to be of 7,002 grains and 6,999 grains.

Imperial Standard Pound
In the United Kingdom, weights and measures have been defined by a long series of Acts of Parliament, the intention of which has been to regulate the sale of commodities. Materials traded in the marketplace are quantified according to accepted units and standards in order to avoid fraud. The standards themselves are legally defined so as to facilitate the resolution of disputes brought to the courts; only legally defined measures will be recognised by the courts. Quantifying devices used by traders (weights, weighing machines, containers of volumes, measures of length) are subject to official inspection, and penalties apply if they are fraudulent.

The Weights and Measures Act 1878 marked a major overhaul of the British system of weights and measures, and the definition of the pound given there remained in force until the 1960s. The pound was defined thus (Section 4) "The ... platinum weight ... deposited in the Standards department of the Board of Trade ... shall continue to be the imperial standard of ... weight ... and the said platinum weight shall continue to be the Imperial Standard for determining the Imperial Standard Pound for the United Kingdom". Paragraph 13 states that the weight  of this standard shall be called the Imperial Standard Pound, and that all other weights mentioned in the act and permissible for commerce shall be ascertained from it alone. It was constructed following the destruction of the Houses of Parliament by fire in 1834, and is stamped "P.S. 1844, 1 lb" (P.S. stands for "Parliamentary Standard").

Redefinition in terms of the kilogram 
The British 1878 Act said that contracts worded in terms of metric units would be deemed by the courts to be made according to the Imperial units defined in the Act, and a table of metric equivalents was supplied so that the Imperial equivalents could be legally calculated. This defined, in UK law, metric units in terms of Imperial ones.

In 1959, based on further measurements and international coordination, the International Yard and Pound Agreement defined an "international pound" as being equivalent to exactly . To remedy this, the pound was again redefined in the United Kingdom by the Weights and Measures Act 1963 to match the international pound, stating: "the pound shall be 0.453 592 37 kilogramme exactly", a definition which remains valid to the present day.

The 2019 redefinition of the SI base units means that the pound is now defined precisely in terms of fundamental constants, ending the era of its definition in terms of physical prototypes.

Troy pound

A troy pound (abbreviated lb t) is equal to 12 troy ounces and to 5,760 grains, that is exactly  grams. Troy weights were used in England by jewellers. Apothecaries also used the troy pound and ounce, but added the drachms and scruples unit in the Apothecaries' system of weights.

Troy weight may take its name from the French market town of Troyes in France where English merchants traded at least as early as the early 9th century.

The troy pound is no longer in general use or a legal unit for trade (it was abolished in the United Kingdom on 6 January 1879 by the Weights and Measures Act of 1878), but the troy ounce,  of a troy pound, is still used for measurements of gems such as opals, and precious metals such as silver, platinum and particularly gold.

Tower pound

The system called Tower weight was the more general name for King Offa's pound. This dates to AD 757 and was based on the silver penny.

The Tower pound was also called the Moneyers' Pound (referring to the Saxon moneyers before the Conquest), the easterling pound, which may refer to traders of eastern Germany, or to traders on the shore of the eastern Baltic sea, or dealers of Asiatic goods who settled at the Steelyard wharf; and the Rochelle Pound by French writers, because it was also in use at Rochelle. An almost identical weight was employed by the Germans for weighing gold and silver.

The mercantile pound (1304) of 6750 troy grains, or 9600 Tower grains, derives from this pound, as 25 shilling-weights or 15 Tower ounces, for general commercial use. Multiple pounds based on the same ounce were quite common. In much of Europe, the apothecaries' and commercial pounds were different numbers of the same ounce. 

The Tower system was referenced to a standard prototype found in the Tower of London and ran concurrently with the avoirdupois and troy systems until the reign of Henry VIII, when a royal proclamation dated 1526 required that the troy pound to be used for mint purposes instead of the Tower pound. No standards of the Tower pound are known to have survived.

The Tower pound was equivalent to about 350 grams.

Merchants' pound
The merchants' pound (mercantile pound, or commercial pound) was considered to be composed of 25 rather than 20 Tower shillings of 12 pence. It was equal to 9,600 wheat grains (15 tower ounces or 6,750 grains) and was used in England until the 14th century for goods other than money and medicine ("electuaries").

London pound

The London pound is that of the Hansa, as used in their various trading places.  The London pound is based on 16 ounces, each ounce divided as the tower ounce.  It never became a legal standard in England; the use of this pound waxed and waned with the influence of the Hansa itself.

A London pound was equal to 7,200 troy grains (16 troy ounces) or, equivalently, 10,240 tower grains (16 tower ounces).

In the United States
In the United States, the avoirdupois pound as a unit of mass has been officially defined in terms of the kilogram since the Mendenhall Order of 1893. That order defined the pound to be  pounds to a kilogram. The following year, this relationship was refined as  pounds to a kilogram, following a determination of the British pound.

In 1959, the United States National Bureau of Standards redefined the pound (avoirdupois) to be exactly equal to 0.453 592 37 kilograms, as had been declared by the International Yard and Pound Agreement of that year. According to a 1959 NIST publication, the United States 1894 pound differed from the international pound by approximately one part in 10 million. The difference is so insignificant that it can be ignored for almost all practical purposes.

Byzantine litra

The Byzantines used a series of measurements known as pounds. It formed the basis of the Byzantine monetary system, with one  of gold equivalent to 72 . Its weight seems to have decreased gradually from the original 324 grams to 319.

Some outlying regions, especially in later times, adopted various local measures, based on Italian, Arab or Turkish measures.

French livre

Since the Middle Ages, various pounds have been used in France. Since the 19th century, a  has referred to the metric pound, 500 g.

It was introduced by the government of John II.

This was a form of official metric pound.

The  (customary unit) was defined as 500 grams by the decree of 28 March 1812. It was abolished as a unit of mass effective 1 January 1840 by a decree of 4 July 1837, but is still used informally.

German and Austrian Pfund
Originally derived from the Roman libra, the definition varied throughout the Holy Roman Empire in the Middle Ages and onward. For example, the measures and weights of the Habsburg monarchy were reformed in 1761 by Empress Maria Theresia of Austria. The unusually heavy Habsburg (civil) pound of 16 ounces was later defined in terms of 560.012 grams. Bavarian reforms in 1809 and 1811 adopted essentially the same standard as the Austrian pound. In Prussia, a reform in 1816 defined a uniform civil pound in terms of the Prussian foot and distilled water, resulting in a Prussian pound of 467.711 grams.

Between 1803 and 1815, all German regions west of the River Rhine were under French control, organised in the departements: Roer, Sarre, Rhin-et-Moselle, and Mont-Tonnerre. As a result of the Congress of Vienna, these regions again became part of various German states. However, many of these regions retained the metric system and adopted a metric pound of precisely 500 grams. Nowadays, the term  is sometimes still in use and universally refers to a pound of 500 grams.

Russian 
The Russian pound is an obsolete Russian unit of measurement of mass. It is equal to 409.51718 grams.

The  was a Scandinavian measurement that varied in weight between regions. From the 17th century onward, it was equal to 425.076 grams in Sweden but was abandoned in 1889 when Sweden switched to the metric system.

In Norway, the same name was used for a weight of 498.1 grams. In Denmark, it equalled 471 grams.

In the 19th century, Denmark followed Germany's lead and redefined the pound as 500 grams.

Portuguese  and 
This  was introduced in 1499 by Manuel I, king of Portugal.

The Portuguese  was the same as 2 . The  or  standard was also used.

Jersey pound
A Jersey pound is an obsolete unit of mass used on the island of Jersey from the 14th century to the 19th century. It was equivalent to about 7,561 grains (490 grams). It may have been derived from the French livre poids de marc.

Trone pound
The trone pound is one of a number of obsolete Scottish units of measurement. It was equivalent to between 21 and 28 avoirdupois ounces (about 600-800 grams).

Metric pound
In many countries, upon the introduction of a metric system, the pound (or its translation) became an historic and obsolete term, although some have kept it as an informal term without a specific value.

Though not from the same linguistic origin, the Chinese  (also known as "catty") in mainland China has a modern definition of exactly 500 grams, divided into 10 . Traditionally around 600 grams, the  has been in use for more than two thousand years varying in exact value from one period to another, serving the same purpose as "pound" for the common-use measure of weight. In Hong Kong, for the purposes of commerce and trade between Britain and Imperial China in the preceding centuries, that three Chinese catties was equivalent to four British imperial pounds, defining one catty as 604.78982 grams in weight precisely. 

Hundreds of older pounds were replaced in this way. Examples of the older pounds are one of around 459 to 460 grams in Spain, Portugal, and Latin America; one of 498.1 grams in Norway; and several different ones in what is now Germany.

From the introduction of the kilogram scales and measuring devices are denominated only in grams and kilograms. A pound of product must be determined by weighing the product in grams as the use of the pound is not sanctioned for trade within the European Union.

Use in weaponry
Smoothbore cannon and carronades are designated by the weight in imperial pounds of round solid iron shot of diameter to fit the barrel. A cannon that fires a six-pound ball, for example, is called a six-pounder''. Standard sizes are 6, 12, 18, 24, 32 and 42 pounds; 68-pounders also exist, and other nonstandard weapons use the same scheme. See carronade.

A similar definition, using lead balls, exists for determining the gauge of shotguns.

See also
Pound-force
Slug (unit)

Notes

References

External links

Conversion between units
 U.S. National Institute of Standards and Technology Special Publication 811
 National Institute of Standards and Technology Handbook 130

Customary units of measurement in the United States
Imperial units
Units of mass
Metricated units